Harry Oscar Dayhoff (May 25, 1896 - February 17, 1963) was a professional football player from Gettysburg, Pennsylvania. He attended Bucknell University and later made his professional debut in the National Football League with the Frankford Yellow Jackets in 1924. In 1925 he played for the Pottsville Maroons and won the 1925 Championship with the team before the title was stripped from the team due to a disputed rules violation.

Notes

1896 births
Players of American football from Pennsylvania
Bucknell Bison football players
Frankford Yellow Jackets players
Pottsville Maroons players
1963 deaths
People from Gettysburg, Pennsylvania